The government of Iraq has established a committee to consider a proposed amendment to the Constitution of Iraq.

Current constitution

The current Constitution of Iraq was drafted by a committee of the Iraqi Transitional Government. The agreed text was put to a referendum in October 2005. It was approved by 79% of voters and 15 out of 18 governorates.

Agreement to consider amendments

In an agreement prior to the referendum, the largest Sunni Arab majority party, the Iraqi Islamic Party agreed to support a "Yes" vote as long as the first parliament elected under the constitution agreed to consider amendments. This agreement was written into Article 142 of the constitution.

Procedure

Article 142 of the constitution states that the Council of Representatives shall form a committee from its members "representing the principal components of the Iraqi society", which should present proposed amendments to the Council within four months. The amendment package shall be voted on as a whole by the Council, and if it is passed, put to a referendum, which shall pass if approved by a majority of voters and is not rejected by a two-thirds majority in three or more governorates. The conditions for this referendum are the same as the conditions for the original ratification referendum.

The constitution can also be amended by a general procedure, laid down in Article 126, which requires a two-thirds approval in the Council of Ministers, followed by approval by a simple majority in a referendum.

Committee appointment

The committee of 27 was appointed on 2006-09-25, chaired by Iraqi Accord Front member Ayad al-Samarrai. The committee comprised 27 members  drawn from senior politicians across the political spectrum in rough proportions to the Council of Representatives of Iraq that was elected in the Iraqi legislative election of December 2005:

 United Iraqi Alliance (Shiite): 12
SCIRI and allies:
Shaykh Hummam Hamudi
Shaykh Jalal al-Din al-Saghir
Abd al-Karim al-Naqib (Badr Organization)
Abbas al-Bayati (Islamic Union of Iraqi Turkoman)
Islamic Dawa Party - Iraq Organisation
Ali al-Allaq
Abd al-Karim al-'Anzi
Islamic Dawa Party
Sami al-'Askari
Islamic Virtue Party
Ammar Tuma
Hassan al-Shammari
independent
Qasim Dawud
unknown
Najiha Abd al-Amir
Jabir Habib Jabir
 Kurdistani Alliance (Kurdish): 5
Fu'ad Ma'sum
Sa'd al-Barzanji
Feryad Rawandazi
Abdallah Salih
Ahmad Anwar Muhammad
 Iraqi Accord Front (Sunni Arab): 4
Iyad al-Samarra'i
Hussein al-Falluji
Salim al-Jabburi
Izz al-Din al-Dawlah
 Iraqi National List (secular): 2
Aliya Nassif Osairan
Hamid Majid Musa
 Iraqi National Dialogue Front: 1
Muhammad Ali Tamim

In addition the representatives of the Turkmen, Mandaeans and Yazidis were invited to nominate a member each to join the committee 

The Iraqi National Dialogue Front have rejected the deal that lead to the formation of the committee and have refused to participate.

Amendments proposed

Seven areas have been identified as areas where one or more of the political forces in Iraq would like to change:

 The ability of constitutional changes to be vetoed by three out of the 19 governorates
 Iraq's Arab identity
 The shape of the federal system
 The status of Kirkuk
 The split of oil revenues between national and regional governments
 The role of Islam
 De-Baathification

Positions

The main proposed amendments have come from the Sunni Arab majority parties who want to make it more difficult to establish an oil-rich Shiite "super-region" in the south of Iraq

However, SCIRI has insisted that "essence" of the constitution should be maintained and has pushed for the creation of a Shiite Region covering the nine southern governorates. On March 16 Abdul Aziz al-Hakim, the leader of SCIRI proposed a compromise whereby two Regions are created - one in the far South near Basra and one for the middle Euphrates region. The Islamic Virtue Party governor of Basra has expressed support for a Region covering Basrah and its only its two neighbouring governorates of Maysan and Dhiqar. The Sadrist Movement supports a stronger central government, saying that federalism should not be applied to the south "while Iraq is still under occupation".

The National Dialogue Front has asked that the de-Baathification provisions be reworded to "be fair to those that have suffered under this article".

Some Shiite leaders had proposed changing the country's official name to the Islamic Republic of Iraq, a move opposed by Iraq's secularists.

Iraq Study Group

The Iraq Study Group of senior American politicians recommended that the constitution be amended as follows:

 Oil revenue should accrue wholly to the central government and not split with the regions
 The referendum on Kirkuk joining the Iraqi Kurdistan region should be delayed

Kurdistani Alliance

The Kurdistani Alliance submitted a working paper in April 2007 with the following proposed changes:
Iraq to be renamed the "Federal Republic of Iraq"
Iraqi Kurdistan to have its own representative at the United Nations

Iraqi Accord Front

The Iraqi Accord Front was reported in July 2007 of seeking the following changes:

 Whilst now accepting the establishment of new Regions of Iraq, it wants the powers of these to be limited
 Deleting references to the religious Hawza of Najaf
 Remove the de-Baathification clauses
 Bringing existing as well as future crude oil fields into the law on oil
 Postponing the Kirkuk status referendum

References

External links 
The Iraqi Council of Representatives
Global Justice Project: Iraq

Constitution of Iraq